Cayuta may refer to:

In New York:
Cayuta, New York, a village in Schuyler County
Cayuta Creek, a tributary of the North Branch of the Susquehanna River
Cayuta Lake, in Schuyler County